

This is a list of the National Register of Historic Places listings in Manistee County, Michigan.

This is intended to be a complete list of the properties and districts on the National Register of Historic Places in Manistee County, Michigan, United States. Latitude and longitude coordinates are provided for many National Register properties and districts; these locations may be seen together in a map.

There are 18 properties and districts listed on the National Register in the county, including 1 National Historic Landmark.

Current listings

|}

See also
 
 List of Michigan State Historic Sites in Manistee County, Michigan
 List of National Historic Landmarks in Michigan
 National Register of Historic Places listings in Michigan
 Listings in neighboring counties: Benzie, Grand Traverse, Lake, Mason, Wexford

References

External links
Michigan State Historic Preservation Office
National Park Service, National Register of Historic Places site

 
Manistee County